The 42° Targa Florio took place on 11 May, on the Circuito Piccolo delle Madonie, (Sicily, Italy).  It was the third round of the 1958 World Sportscar Championship, which was running to new regulations introduced at the beginning of the season. The most influential of these regulations changes would be the 3.0 litre engine size limit. The event returned to the championship for the first time since 1955, following the demise of the Mille Miglia and the ban on road racing on mainland Italy. But such outcry did not deter Vincenzo Florio from holding his event on the traditional 45 mile mountainous circuit.

Report

Entry

A massive total of 65 racing cars were registered for this event, of which 53 arrived for practice. Of these, only 38 started the long-distance race on the public roads of Sicily. This, the 42nd edition of the event, saw a change on the nature of the race. Two drivers would be permitted now and the limit set so no driver would drive more than seven laps out of the total race distance of 14. So, it ensured no single driver would be able to complete the whole race.

The first two events of the season, the 1000 km Buenos Aires and 12 Hours of Sebring ended with victory for Phil Hill and Peter Collins, for Scuderia Ferrari. As Hill and Collins also won the last race of the previous season, the Venezuelan Grand Prix they’ve now won three races in a row for the Scuderia. With these new rules, and Maserati on the brink of financial crisis, Scuderia Ferrari would head the Italian challenge. Ferrari had four works 250 TRs in Sicily, Hill/Collins, Mike Hawthorn/Wolfgang von Trips, Luigi Musso/Olivier Gendebien and Gino Munaron/Wolfgang Seidel. Opposition would no longer come from Maserati, but from Porsche and Aston Martin.

David Brown sent just one Aston Martin DBR1 over from England for Stirling Moss/Tony Brooks, while Porsche arrived with three different cars, a 356A Carrera, a 550 RS and a 718 RSK, for their squad of drivers led by Jean Behra and Giorgio Scarlatti. They were joined by a fleet of privateer drivers in their Alfa Romeos, Oscas and other mainline sportscars.

Qualifying

Prior to the race, there was no formal practice held, but Sergio Der Stephanian was killed in a pre-race accident, following a collision with a sand-laden lorry. He died shortly after in hospital.

Race

 
With each lap 45 miles in length, the race covered a total of 14 laps, or 630 miles, the Targa Florio is unlike any other sports car race. Littered with switchback turns, blind corners and a straight nearly four miles longer than Circuit de la Sarthe’s Mulsanne, the Targa was a fearsome thing to behold.

Day of the race would be sunny and warm, with the first of the cars leaving the small village of Cerda, one-by-one, at 40 second intervals. It was clear right at the start that something was amiss for most of the competitors, as more than a few would be off the pace, while others would be off the road, in verges trying to repair their cars and get back into the race. Jean Behra would spin his Porsche 718 RSK. Moss would damage a wheel when he went off the road. Meanwhile, von Trips damaged his Ferrari heavily and returned to the pits dragging a bit of his car along the ground. It seemed that everyone was struggling over the mountain roads, except one, Musso.

Musso was setting an incredible pace. He started last of the big works entrants, but at the end of the first lap, he would be first. Being in the lead, he set about performing an error-free drive. Moss would be on the hunt in his Aston, ever-impressive sliding around the corners, kicking up gravel everywhere and carrying on without any trouble whatsoever, following that earlier incident. He would break the lap record, lapping more than a minute faster than Musso. But the Italian had already done all of his headwork. He led and held steady before handing the car over to Gendebien.

With Gendebien now the car, Moss would take his Aston even faster, but it came at a price. After five laps, the gearbox gave up and Moss was out of the race, before Brooks had a chance to race. Despite the retirement of the sole Aston Martin, the circuit maintained the pressure on the factory efforts. Hill would end up in a ditch, losing valuable time trying to get out and back on his way. As for the Belgian, he was driving smartly, keeping the car on the road, and in the lead. He was just a few laps before returning the car back to Musso. This was the only Ferrari not under heavy pressure from Behra. The nimble little RSK was providing its self on the winding roads, and joining the battle for a spot in the top three.

Musso held a commanding lead, despite the advances of Behra. But Musso was not immune to trouble. Only three laps from the end, there was trouble. He appeared to be off the pace, lapping four minutes slower than previously. He was happy to make it back to the pits, as the brake fluid had leaked out of its reservoir. He had no brakes. It was reported that he completed the descent out of the mountains by staying in low gear. In any other race, this would have spelled the end, however, Musso and Gendebien had controlled the race right from the start. Such was their lead, the Ferrari mechanics repaired the car, Gendebien got back in the car for the remaining laps, still with a three-minute lead.

Now the leaders were out of trouble, their teammates von Trips and Hawthorn were not.  They were in second place, but with Behra back in the Porsche and absolutely flying. Following a pit stop, the margin between the Ferrari and Porsche would be practically nothing. There was no stopping Behra, and he continued to up his pace and Hawthorn could not respond. Starting the 14th and last lap, Behra’s pace had meant he was now ahead.

Out in front, Gendebien brought the 250 TR home, to record a brilliant victory. Though Moss had set a new lap record in his Aston, the race had been dominated from the very beginning by Musso. Car number 106, took an impressive victory, winning in a time 10hr 37:58.1, averaging a speed of 59.251 mph. Second place went to the Porsche of Behra and Giorgio Scarlatti, albeit over 5½ minutes adrift. The podium was complete by second Scuderia Ferrari of von Trips and Hawthorn, who were 54 secs behind in third.

Official Classification

Class Winners are in Bold text.

 Fastest Lap: Stirling Moss, 42:17.5secs (63.842 mph)

Class Winners

Standings after the race

Championship points were awarded for the first six places in each race in the order of 8-6-4-3-2-1, excepting the RAC Tourist Trophy, for which points were awarded 4-3-2-1 for the first four places. Manufacturers were only awarded points for their highest finishing car with no points awarded for positions filled by additional cars. Only the best 4 results out of the 6 races could be retained by each manufacturer.

References

Further reading

Ed Heuvink. Targa Florio: 1955-1973. Reinhard Klien. 978-2927458666.

Targa Florio
Targa Florio
Targa Florio